Live in Japan is Do as Infinity's second live album, as well as a concert DVD. It was a recording of the first live concert that Do as Infinity held in Budokan which was part of the Gates of Heaven Tour. Guitarist Ryo Owatari considered Budokan as a place where only the best bands could play. The CD version was recorded on 31 January 2004 and the DVD version on 1 February 2004.

Track listing

Disc one
 "Gates of heaven"
 
 "under the sun"
 "We are."
 MC
 
 "Desire"
 
 
 MC

Disc two
 MC
 "Week!"
 
 
 "135"
 MC
 "One or Eight"
 "Thanksgiving Day"
 MC -encore-
 "Rock and Roll All Nite" -encore-
 MC -encore-
 "Tangerine Dream" -encore-
 MC -encore-
 "Field of Dreams" -encore-
 MC -encore-
 "SUMMER DAYS" -encore-
  -encore-

DVD
 Gates of heaven 	
 本日ハ晴天ナリ 	
 under the sun 	
 We are. 	
 陽のあたる坂道 	
 Oasis 	
 アザヤカナハナ 	
 トレジャプレジャ 	
 ブランコ 	
 柊 	
 深い森 	
 科学の夜 	
 Week! 	
 遠くまで 	
 冒険者たち 	
 135 	
 One or Eight 	
 Thanksgiving Day 	
 Detroit Rock City　-ENCORE- 	
 Tangerine Dream　-ENCORE- 	
 Field of dreams　-ENCORE- 	
 SUMMER DAYS　-ENCORE- 	
 あいのうた　-ENCORE-

Chart positions

Sales is for the CD version.

External links
 Do As Infinity Live in Japan at Avex Network
 Do As Infinity Live in Japan at Oricon

Do As Infinity albums
2004 live albums
2004 video albums
Avex Group live albums
Avex Group video albums
Albums recorded at the Nippon Budokan